Iqos (/ˈaɪkoʊs/ EYE-kohs, stylized as IQOS) is a line of heated tobacco and electronic cigarette products manufactured by Philip Morris International (PMI). It was first introduced in November 2014 in Japan and Italy. Most of the IQOS products are devices that heat tobacco without burning it.  The World Health Organization states that there is currently no evidence to show that heated tobacco products such as Iqos are less harmful than other tobacco products. A recent systematic review reached the same conclusion. The European Respiratory Society state that heated tobacco products are addictive and cause cancer in humans. WHO also states that heated tobacco products do not help smokers quit tobacco use.

History 
Philip Morris took its first commercial steps in the field of heated tobacco in the 1990's with "Accord" and "Heatbar" before they were withdrawn from the market.  In 2014 Iqos was introduced, first in in Japan and Italy. Starting in 2016, Philip Morris began heavily promoting a "smoke-free future", stating an intento to increasingly focus commercial efforts on products that are alternatives to cigarettes. Iluma, a new Iqos system using induction heating technology, was launched in Japan in 2021. As of 2020, Iqos accounted for 5.5% of the global tobacco market.  It also "determined that the evidence did not support issuing risk modification orders at this time". PMI's efforts toward a "smoke-free" business transition allowed the company to begin the process of issuing sustainable bonds to finance itself in August 2021, which raised fears of greenwashing.

Construction

Components 
Most Iqos models consists of a charger and a pen-like holder. A disposable stick (called "HeatStick" or "Heets") containing processed tobacco and glycerin is inserted into the holder, which then heats it to temperatures up to 350 °C for inhalation. Iluma, a more recent iteration, relies on induction to heat the tobacco sticks (called "Terea").

Waste 
Philip Morris claims that Iqos reduces waste and carbon emissions compared to a cigarette, and presents the product as being part of its sustainability initiatives. The company is also promoting itself as a player in the circular economy by arguing that Iqos devices can be recycled by being returned to manufacturing centers. These claims were disputed by the Public Health Law Center at Saint Paul, Minnesota, as used HeatSticks constitute waste similar to conventional cigarette butts. Furthermore, it was noted that "new products such as e-cigarettes, or heated cigarette products like Iqos, will increase the overall supply of e-waste. It is most likely impossible to create any e-cigarette without a battery, poisonous liquid, metals and plastics joined in small devices, each of which cannot be recycled or disposed of responsibly."

Health Effects 
Many of the early studies of Iqos were funded by the tobacco industry. A 2021 independent systematic review noted some reduction in risk markers among users compared to cigarette users. However, it also noted Iqos use was reported to alter mitochondrial function, which could further exaggerate airway inflammation and lung cancer. The review concluded that "research seems to be necessary to assess the frequency of HTP use and its potential negative health effects."  A 2022 Cochrane review of 13 studies concluded:

Marketing 
The Iqos 2.2 was the first commercially launched device under the brand name. In 2021, Iqos devices were available in approximately 70 countries. Among them, the United States, Canada, Belarus, Moldova, Georgia, Israel, Sweden, South Korea and Portugal have chosen to adopt a specific approach to supervise the sale of heated tobacco/Iqos. In Canada and Israel, the packaging of Iqos devices is fully covered with a warning message. In the United States, the FDA granted Philip Morris authorization to make a "reduced exposure" marketing claim, considering that switching completely from cigarettes to Iqos reduces exposure to harmful chemicals, but specifically did not allow Philip Morris to make any claim that switching from cigarettes to Iqos reduces the user's risk of disease. The decision to allow for reduced exposure claims was criticized by the World Health Organization as misleading to consumers.

Direct marketing 
Philip Morris is regularly accused of circumventing laws prohibiting the promotion of tobacco by claiming that Iqos is not a tobacco product. Canada updated its tobacco laws to clearly include heated tobacco devices in the list of regulated tobacco products. In France, it was reported that Philip Morris was promoting its devices at private parties, with salespersons sometimes offering alcoholic beverages to interested customers.

Philip Morris has been accused of using unregulated or illegal marketing strategies: a 2018 report stated that "Iqos boutique stores are the focus of aggressive promotion including exchanging a pack of cigarettes or lighter for an Iqos device, launch parties, 'meet and greet' lunches and after-hour events". According to Reuters "The marketing strategy mimics that of tobacco companies in the mid-20th century, when they started associating cigarettes with Hollywood and high society."

Philip Morris has also reportedly carried out several marketing campaigns directly mentioning Iqos, presenting the product as a "smoke-free" and a "reduced-risk" alternative, encouraging consumers to quit smoking or switch to Iqos. This marketing approach has come under criticism. A critical review of reports submitted by PMI to the FDA in support of its application claimed that "Consumers may misunderstand what is meant by 'switching completely' [and] are likely to misunderstand the unsupported claims of reduced risk". In granting the exposure order the FDA however stated that adult consumers correctly understood the messages that were authorized.

Youth-oriented marketing 
In 2019, Reuters reported that Philip Morris was using social media influencers in several countries to make them "ambassadors" for the brand and promote Iqos to a young audience. PMI responded that it would cease use of influencers. According to Matthew Myers, president of the Campaign for Tobacco-Free Kids, the company "is changing its behavior only when caught red-handed."

Also in 2020, a report on Philip Morris' Iqos implementation strategy in Australia pointed out that "Philip Morris has strongly lobbied the Australian government to legalize heated tobacco products, while simultaneously making plans to sell Iqos at young adult-friendly premises such as bars, clubs and pubs if its proposed legislative changes are made."

Criticism and Controversies 
In December 2017, Reuters published documents and testimonies from former employees alleging irregularities in the clinical trials conducted by PMI for the approval of the Iqos product by the U.S. FDA. This investigative work reported that Philip Morris was lobbying to block or weaken the provisions made under the WHO Framework Convention on Tobacco Control (FCTC), going against the idea that the company would support a smoke-free future.

A number of third-party toxicity studies had findings which often contradicted those of Philip Morris International. UCSF-based Professor Stanton Glantz concluded that in terms of harmfulness, "Iqos is not detectably different from conventional cigarettes." A 2020 systematic review of the available scientific literature found very limited available data on the effects of Iqos on a smoker's health and recommended further studies.

In October 2018, the Belgian Cancer Foundation issued advice on Iqos, based on previous independent studies published on the subject. The Foundation claimed that "Iqos is not a solution" for quitting smoking." It further stated that "if the tobacco giant is positioning itself in this innovative market, it is to compensate for the financial losses resulting from the reduced sales of cigarettes (...). The tobacco industry is therefore exploring solutions in order to continue to make profits and keep dependent consumers."

In July 2020, the World Health Organization (WHO) published a "statement on heated tobacco products and the U.S. FDA decision regarding Iqos", which read: "WHO reiterates that reducing exposure to harmful chemicals in Heated Tobacco Products (HTPs) does not render them harmless, nor does it translate to reduced risk to human health. Indeed, some toxins are present at higher levels in HTP aerosols than in conventional cigarette smoke, and there are some additional toxins present in HTP aerosols that are not present in conventional cigarette smoke. The health implications of exposure to these are unknown. (...) Given that health may be affected by exposure to additional toxins when using HTPs, claims that HTPs reduce exposure to harmful chemicals relative to conventional cigarettes may be misleading."

According to the University of Bath's TobaccoTactics website, "There is very little evidence that Iqos is effective as a [cigarette] quit tool at the individual level or population level." According to the Netherlands National Institute for Public Health and the Environment, Iqos is "harmful to health, but probably less harmful than smoking tobacco cigarettes".

In September 2021, the U.S. International Trade Commission ruled that Philip Morris International and its commercial partner Altria must stop the sale and import of the Iqos device in the United States because of a patent case filed by R.J. Reynolds. The U.S. International Trade Commission found that the cigarette alternative infringed on two of Reynolds' patents. Philip Morris International announced its plans to appeal the trade agency's decision.

References 

Heated tobacco products
Electronic cigarettes
Tobacco
Products introduced in 2014
Philip Morris brands